Nether Kellet is a village and civil parish in the City of Lancaster in Lancashire, England, a few miles south of Carnforth. It had a population of 646 recorded in the 2001 census, increasing to 663 at the 2011 Census. The parish includes the small hamlet of Addington, to the east.

Community
Nether Kellet is one of the Thankful Villages - only 53 of which are known. These villages and parishes sent men to fight in the Great War, 1914–1918, and all of them came back alive. Nether Kellet sent 21. Their near neighbour, Arkholme,  to the east, sent by far the most, 59 men, all of whom returned. It is remarkable to think that two small villages, geographically so close to one another, escaped unscathed from such a conflagration.
Furthermore, Nether Kellet was doubly thankful, as 16 villagers served in World War II, 1939–1945, without loss of life.

Geography
The village is located south of Over Kellet, north of Halton, west of Aughton and east of Bolton-le-Sands.

In literature
The accompanying plate, from a painting by George Pickering, shows a number of ramblers with a dog climbing on rocks beside a waterfall.

See also

Listed buildings in Nether Kellet

References

External links

Villages in Lancashire
Civil parishes in Lancashire
Geography of the City of Lancaster